Pepita Pardell Terrade (16 March 1928 – 11 July 2019) was a Spanish animator, cartoonist, illustrator, and painter. She was a pioneer of animation cinema in Spain. In 1945, she worked on the first animated film, in color, in Europe. Pardell was awarded the Creu de Sant Jordi in 2018.

Biography
Pepita Pardell Terrade was born in Barcelona on 16 March 1928. At the age of fourteen, Pardell told her mother that she didn't want to be a shop assistant (a traditional job for a girl of her age, at that time). Her father, from whom she inherited a passion for drawing, let Pardell study at Escola de la Llotja. Her grandfather, Josep Pardell Mateu, worked with Antoni Gaudí.

Pardell began her career in the field of animation in 1944, when she worked for the production company Balet y Blay and was part of the Garbancito de la Mancha team (1944), which was the first animated feature film in Spain and the first European film of color cartoons, directed by Arturo Moreno. At Balet and Blay, she also participated in the creation of Alegres vacaciones (1948) and Los sueños de Tay-Pi (1952).

From 1951 to 1962, Pardell worked as an illustrator, drawing comic books for Ediciones Toray. In 1962, she went to work for the animation producer Estudios Buch-Sanjuán. Subsequently, she affiliated with Publivisión, Pegbar Productions, Equipo and Cine Nic. Throughout her long career, Pardell worked with directors such as Robert Balser and Jordi Amorós.

Pardell died in Barcelona on 11 July 2019.

Filmography 
 1945: Garbancito de la Mancha  
 1948: Alegres Vacaciones 
 1952: Los sueños de Tay-pi 
 1975: La doncella guerrera  
 1978: Yogi's Space Race  
 1979: El león, la Bruja y el Armario 
 1983: The Charlie Brown and Snoopy Show (series de televisión) 
 1984: Goldilocks and the Three Bears  
 1986: Mofli, el último Koala  
 1990: Despertaferro

Awards and honors
 2016, Trajectory prize, Animac
 2018, Honorary Member, Catalan Film Academy
 2018, Creu de Sant Jordi
 2019, Vila de Gràcia Premi, Individual Prize of Honor

References

1928 births
2019 deaths
20th-century Spanish women artists
21st-century Spanish women artists
People from Barcelona
Spanish animators
Spanish cartoonists
Spanish illustrators
20th-century Spanish painters
Spanish women animators
Spanish comics artists
Spanish female comics artists
Spanish women cartoonists
Spanish women illustrators
Spanish women painters